Grosgrain (also sometimes  ) is a type of fabric or ribbon defined by the fact that its weft is heavier than its warp, creating prominent transverse ribs. Grosgrain is a plain weave corded fabric, with heavier cords than poplin but lighter than faille, and is known for being a firm, close-woven, fine-corded fabric. Grosgrain has a dull appearance, with little luster in comparison to many fabric weaves, such as satin, often used for ribbons; however, it is comparatively very strong. Grosgrain fabric is most commonly available in black, but grosgrain ribbon comes in a large variety of colors and patterns. The ribbon is very similar to Petersham ribbon in its appearance, but it does not have the ability to follow the curves of a surface or edge the way that the latter does.

"Grosgrain" is commonly used to refer to a heavy, stiff ribbon of silk or nylon woven via taffeta weave using a heavy weft, which results in distinct transverse ribs. Historically, grosgrain was made from wool, silk, or a combination of fibers such as silk and wool or silk and mohair. When a combination of fibers was used, the end result was sometimes given the name grogram, silk mohair, gros de Tours or gros de Napels.

Etymology
Grosgrain is both a direct French loan word and a folk corruption of the French word . Grogram, originally  (appeared in literature in 1562), is defined as a coarse, loosely woven fabric of silk, silk and mohair, or silk and wool. The adjective  means thick or coarse, originally from the Old French , itself derived from the Latin . Grain is derived from Old French , itself derived from the Latin  (plural of ) – seed or in some contexts texture.

Thus gros gram, grogram and grosgrain are all one and the same: a large grain - hence coarse - texture fabric.

The term grog, meaning alcohol, is related to the term grogram. In the 1740s, Admiral Edward Vernon, who was known as "Old Grog" because of the grogram cloak he wore, introduced the rum ration in the British Royal Navy. It is from his attire that the naval term grog is derived.

Moire
Moire is a waved or watered effect produced especially on grosgrain silk and woolen moreen via engraved rollers and high pressure on carded material. The end result is a peculiar luster which works best when made from a corded fabric like grosgrain.

During the Middle Ages, moire was held in high esteem and was, as currently, used for women's dresses, for capes, and for facings, trimmings, etc.

Use in clothing

History
Throughout the 17th century, grosgrain fabric was used as the fabric body (corpus) for many garments, including waistcoats, jackets, petticoats, beeches, sleeves, jerkins and many other items of clothing, as a cheaper alternative for the lower socio-economic demographic than fine-woven silk or wool. Factories in America started to produce grosgrain silk in the late 19th century.

Throughout the 1920s, the term grosgrain seems to have remained true to original definition as a garment fabric. However, during the 1920s, it fell out of favor as a garment fabric, and was defined identically to contemporary terminology as a grosgrain ribbon.

Structural uses
Lustrous grosgrain is used extensively to join female semi-detached clothing articles such as bodices to skirts and similar, where this necessary joint may be visible. Ribbed grosgrain may be used similarly to twill tape for internal gussets and reinforcements. Grosgrain ribbon is often used for facings and for waistbands. 
McCall's Sewing Book states: "grosgrain ribbon is used with any heavy fabric to reduce bulk", though it may be the word "bulk" is used in the sense of outward appearance, rather than actual mass. McCall elaborates: "grosgrain is used to finish the back of novelty braid or to face the back of any fabric belt."

Evening wear
As a more subtle option to lustrous satin, grosgrain is very popular with evening wear, used on the facings of lapels of most dress coats and high-end dinner jackets and tuxedos. Grosgrain is traditionally used to hem and highlight the cut of lapels, collars and visible outermost edges of the formal frock coat and the later morning coat. Grosgrain is preferred over satin for practicality—it is more durable than silk or satin, as the fabric does not snag as easily. Grosgrain is also used for matching accessories such as bow ties and cummerbunds, though these are often in barathea to complement the main suiting.

Millinery
Grosgrain is also used in millinery. Grosgrain ribbons are popular for use in ribbon decorations for hats, however, grosgrain is most notably used in top hats, fedora hats, and opera hats, or as the trimming band on the Homburg.

Other uses

Book-binding
Grosgrain fabric and ribbon are common structural fabrics for the joining or reinforcement of spines or sheaves in fine commercial and hobby bookbinding and book restoration.

Cargo and packing use
A particular characteristic of grosgrain ribbon is that the thicker weft resists longitudinal curling, and so it exerts an even pressure when tied around crushable materials. Nylon grosgrain is often used as heavy-duty webbing or binding around luggage, packs, messenger bags and other heavy-use "soft" goods. It is also used for securing cargo. It can be dyed and is available in a variety of colours, though it is typically dyed black.

Early seat belts and military webbing during World War II was typically made of hemp, jute or linen grosgrain.

Craft
Grosgrain made out of cotton or low-cost synthetic fibres such as polyester are very common for gift-wrap ribbons, or for decorating and ornamenting scrapbooks and greeting cards. Grosgrain ribbon is used for a variety of different crafts as well, from bead making, to book-binding, trimming or embellishing, as well as a multitude of other uses. Grosgrain ribbon is the primary ribbon material used in the hair bow industry.

Lanyards

Grosgrain woven from cotton or low-cost synthetic fibres such as polyester are very popular for use as lanyard, straps, and are often sold printed for use by large corporate companies as a marketing or branding tool.

Percussion
Polyester grosgrain in a  width can be used as the tensioning material attaching the snares of a snare drum to the throw-off mechanism, with the ribbing providing good insurance against slippage. Some musicians use it in an attempt to lessen sympathetic snare buzz from external sources, as it will hold the tab ends of the snares closer to the head than string, providing more dampening than mylar straps.

See also 

 Petersham ribbon
Faille

Notes

References

Woven fabrics